Slug (Ulysses X. Lugman) is a fictional supervillain appearing in American comic books published by Marvel Comics.

Publication history
The Slug first appeared in Captain America #325 (Jan 1987), and was created by Mark Gruenwald and Paul Neary.

Creator Mark Gruenwald remarked "At the time, I thought a 1,200 pound man was a bit far-fetched, but I've since read about such a guy in People."

Fictional character biography
Ulysses Lugman was born in Miami, Florida. He is a Miami-based drug kingpin and criminal organizer and also the president and owner of several legal businesses. Ulysses took up the name Slug due to his obese appearance. When he was learned to be the Kingpin's Miami drug connection, his organization was infiltrated by Nomad. He battled Nomad and Captain America, and his business was toppled and his yacht was sunk with the assistance of Vagabond.

The Slug later conferred with the Kingpin about a disruption in the drug supply caused by the High Evolutionary's agents. The Slug agreed to eliminate investment counselor Joe Trinity for his employee Dallas Kerr. He encountered a transformed Trinity and Poison.

Lugman is one of the villains shown in the crossover event Dead Man's Hand. A mysterious organization creates a meeting in Las Vegas to divide up the territory and related situations of the deposed criminal mastermind the Kingpin. Among the many criminal groups that attended are the Secret Empire, Werner von Strucker and Hammerhead's group. The situation falls apart due to various factors, including infighting among the group leaders and the slightly successful infiltration of Microchip and Mickey Fondozzi.

Having been warned by Nomad's enemy the 'Favor Broker', Lugman attempts to flee the situation in a vehicle specially designed to accommodate his weight. The vigilantes Daredevil, Punisher, and Nomad track down the vehicle due to its unique size and the small number of ways out of town. It is Nomad who has a personal stake in the confrontation, hating Lugman especially. Circumstance saves Lugman's life as it is Nomad and not the criminal-murdering Punisher, who gets to him first. After a moral quandary and the depressing realization that Lugman has simply forgotten Nomad, the vigilante hero knocks him out. Despite this, Punisher tries to kill Lugman, only to realize his weapon is empty.

Later, Lugman is seen bowing under the pressure and blackmail of Don Fortunato who wishes to be the new Kingpin of Crime. Spider-Man and Daredevil help break up this meeting, seemingly leaving Ulysses free with his territory intact. He was seen imprisoned in The Raft, a prison for superhuman criminals.

Slug breaks out of the Raft and joins the Hood's criminal empire. He helps them fight the New Avengers but is taken down by Doctor Strange.

During the "Secret Invasion" storyline, Hood's crime syndicate were questioning one of a group of Skrulls that had tried to take Madame Masque. It is soon discovered that Slug is a Skrull in disguise when Hood uses a spell that successfully reveals the Skrull. As a result, the Skrull posing as Slug is killed by the Hood who then orders his group to burn its body. The other villains' present wonder when Slug had been replaced.

During the "Dark Reign" storyline, the real Slug is later seen as part of the Hood's criminal gang that is sent by Norman Osborn to attack the New Avengers. The fight takes place inside the former Hellfire Club. He and most of the group are defeated in battle.

After video footage of Tigra being beaten by the Hood is released onto the internet, Tigra and Giant-Man identify Slug as the source of the footage. Now penniless after the Hood's fall from power, Slug sold the footage to a celebrity video website for money needed to leave the country. He is defeated by Tigra and Giant-Man and placed under arrest.

Slug returned to Miami and reestablished his criminal empire. In the midst of the "Last Days" part of the Secret Wars storyline, Mary Morgan hires Scott Lang to steal back an Asgardian artifact that she had lost to Slug over a game of contract bridge.

As part of the All-New, All-Different Marvel, Slug used Power Broker II's Hench App to hire the second Hijacker to steal a Giganto egg from a S.H.I.E.L.D. cargo ship.

During the "Search for Tony Stark" arc, Slug rejoins Hood's gang as they attack Castle Doom.

During the "Hunted" storyline, Slug is among the animal-themed characters that were captured by Taskmaster and Black Ant for Kraven the Hunter's "Great Hunt" which was sponsored by Arcade's company Arcade Industries.

Powers and abilities
The Slug has a gifted intellect and is a master strategist with a keen mind for business and the ability to lead through intimidation and reward.

His only "power" would seem to be his immense fat: he may weigh more than one thousand pounds. According to The Official Handbook of the Marvel Universe: Update '89, it is conceivable that the Slug is actually a mutant, inasmuch as it is difficult to imagine how a normal person could achieve such tremendous mass and still remain alive. Unlike Blob, the Slug has no means of compensating for this mass, so he is almost immobile when not making use of a high-tech personal hovercraft. The Slug's high percentage of fat enables him to float effortlessly in water. His metabolism grants him limited immunity to drugs and poisons. The Slug has been known on occasion to asphyxiate his victims (usually underlings who failed or displeased him) in the folds of his flesh.

The Slug is extraordinarily obese, so much so that he is unable to support his own weight by standing and is unable to move his body mass under his own power. He needs to consume vast quantities of food and liquid every day, so he eats during most of his waking moments.

Equipment
The Slug has extremely light-sensitive eyes, causing him to wear shaded eyeglasses virtually all the time.

Slug rides special custom-designed heavy-duty electric wheelchair/forklifts fitted with tank treads or heavy tires. His chairs appear to operate by remote control, and often feature built-in flotation devices or rocket boosters for air escape. For longer distances, the Slug rides in a custom semi-trailer.

References

External links
 Slug at Marvel Wiki
 Slug at Comic Vine

Characters created by Mark Gruenwald
Characters created by Paul Neary
Comics characters introduced in 1987
Fictional characters from Miami
Fictional gangsters
Marvel Comics mutants
Marvel Comics supervillains